Suzanne Delvé (1892–1986) was a French film actress. While most of her roles were during the silent era, she also appeared in a few sound films such as Maurice Tourneur's Accused, Stand Up! (1930).

Selected filmography
 Les Vampires (1916)
 Rose de Nice (1921)
 The Cradle of God (1926)
 Martyr (1927)
 Accused, Stand Up! (1930)
 A Father Without Knowing It (1932)
 Golden Venus (1938)

References

Bibliography
 Waldman, Harry. Maurice Tourneur: The Life and Films. McFarland, 2001.

External links

1892 births
1986 deaths
French film actresses
French silent film actresses
20th-century French actresses
Actresses from Paris